is a Japanese footballer currently playing as a midfielder for Renofa Yamaguchi FC.

Career statistics

Club
.

Notes

References

External links

1998 births
Living people
Sportspeople from Shimane Prefecture
Association football people from Shimane Prefecture
Fukuoka University alumni
Japanese footballers
Association football midfielders
J2 League players
Renofa Yamaguchi FC players